Rosca (ring or bagel) is a Spanish and Portuguese bread dish eaten in Spain, Mexico, South America, and other areas. It is made with flour, salt, sugar, butter, yeast, water, and seasonings. It is also called ka'ake and referred to as a "Syrian-style cracker ring".

Roscas de reyes variation

Roscas de reyes (ring of kings or three King's bread) is eaten on "El Dia de Los Reyes" ("The Day of the Kings"), which is part of the celebration of the Three Kings visiting the infant Jesus to give him gifts (traditionally gold, myrrh, and incense).

The cake itself is an oversized version of kingcake colored with candy fruit. Raisins, milk, anise, cinnamon, vanilla, and colorful candy fruit are used depending on the recipe.<ref>Virginia Nylander Ebinger Aguinaldos: Christmas customs, music, and foods of the Spanish-speaking countries of the Americas Sunstone Press, 2008 , page 234.</ref>

At least one plastic miniature figurine of the baby Jesus can be hidden inside the cake. The person who finds it is seen as the lucky winner of the prize (whatever that might be). In many traditions, the person who finds a plastic baby first must host a dinner party, and anyone who finds another plastic baby must bring a dish. The dinner party is hosted on 2 February, which is called "Dia de la Virgen de la Candelaria" ("Day of the Virgin of Candelaria"). After eating the rosca, the children leave their shoes near the doorstep so they can receive a small gift.

Gallery

See also

 List of breakfast foods
 List of doughnut varieties

References

 External links 

 A State Mandated Christmas Bonus, a blog post by the Law Library of Congress, makes reference to the ''.

Doughnuts
Mexican breads
South American cuisine